Notopsalta is a small genus of cicada in the family Cicadidae, endemic to eastern Australia and the North Island of New Zealand.

Species
 Notopsalta atrata (Goding & Froggatt, 1904)  (Australia)
 Notopsalta sericea (Walker, 1850)   (New Zealand)

References
 
 LandCare

Hemiptera of Australia
Cicadas of New Zealand
Cicadettini
Cicadidae genera